Zaxidfest (previously known as Zaxid) is an annual international music and art festival held in the middle of August near Lviv, Ukraine. ZAKHID was founded in 2009 as a festival of Ukrainian rock and ethno music. Later it has lost an attachment to some concrete music genre and was expanded by different foreign artists (including Anti-Flag, Caliban, Clawfinger, Ektomorf, Everlast, Ill Niño, Kreator, Oomph!, Zdob şi Zdub and others).

Every year organizers conduct online-survey where anybody can propose and vote for artist. In this way the list of participants is formed. Also some artists are invited based on organizers' initiative and their names are hidden until the tickets sales start.

The festivals name "Zakhid" means in Ukrainian equivocally West (or Western, meaning western part of Ukraine) and Event.

Location 
In 2009 and 2010 Zakhid was held in towns of Zvenyhorod and Stare Selo respectively (around 20 km from Lviv). Since 2011 the festival has been relocated to the village of Rodatychi (around 40 km from Lviv).

Participants 
There is a list of some Zakhid participants:

 Alina Orlova
 Anti-Flag
 Atmasfera
 Balthazar
 Behemoth (cancelled)
 BoomBox
 Braty Hadiukiny
 Breaking Benjamin (cancelled)
 Bullet for my Valentine
 Caliban
 Chelsea Grin
 Clawfinger
 Crystal Castles
 Dakh Daughters
 Dark Tranquility
 DevilDriver
 Dymna Sumish
 Editors
 Ektomorf
 Enter Shikari
 Everlast
 Flit
 Flunk
 Guano Apes
 Hollywood Undead
 IAMX
 Ill Niño
 In Extremo
 Jayce Lewis
 Kadebostany
 Krambambula
 Kreator
 Krykhitka Tsakhes
  Khors
 Luk
 Liapis Trubetskoi
 Miss May I
 Noize MC
 Oomph!
 Pain
 Perkalaba
 Qarpa
 Sepultura
 Skriabin
 Tartak
 The Qemists
 Therion
 Tin Sontsia
 TNMK
 Vopli Vidopliasova
 Brutto
 Zdob şi Zdub
 Zhadan i Sobaky
 We Butter the Bread with Butter

References

External links 
 Official website

Lviv Oblast
Rock festivals in Ukraine
Summer events in Ukraine
2009 establishments in Ukraine
Music festivals established in 2009